Emanuele Repetti (1776-1852) was an Italian historian and naturalist who wrote extensively on the history of Tuscany. He was born in Carrara.

Works
He contributed to the Antologia of Vieusseux and the Atti of the Accademia dei Georgofili, of which he was secretary. From 1833 to 1846, he published the Dizionario geografico, fisico e storico della Toscana, which offers an account of the natural and civic history of municipalities in Tuscany. His work was primarily cultural, historical, linguistic and archaeological in nature.

References

Further reading
  1833-1845 (6 volumes)

Repetti
Repettii
Emanuele Repetti
Repetti